NTC Dunajská Lužná (Národné tréningové centrum Dunajská Lužná) is a football training center of the Slovak Football Association and a multi-use stadium in Dunajská Lužná, Slovakia. It is currently used mostly for football matches and is the home ground of OFK Dunajská Lužná. The stadium holds 500 seating people.

References

Football in Slovakia